WEIO (100.9 FM, "100.9 The Farm") is a radio station broadcasting a country music format. Licensed to Huntingdon, Tennessee, United States, the station is currently owned by Jim W. Freeland.

The station broadcasts online using Stream101 SHOUTcast service and is available to listen to directly on WEIO's webpage.

References

External links
 
 

Country radio stations in the United States
EIO
Carroll County, Tennessee